Mitchell Gans is an American legal scholar and Rivkin Radler Distinguished Professor of Law at Hofstra University.

References

Living people
American legal scholars
Hofstra University faculty
Year of birth missing (living people)